Jannaschia donghaensis is a Gram-negative and non-motile bacterium from the genus of Jannaschia which has been isolated from seawater from the Sea of Japan from the Liancourt Rocks.

References

Rhodobacteraceae
Bacteria described in 2007